"Divorce Me C.O.D." is a 1946 honky-tonk song recorded by Merle Travis. One of many songs co-written by Travis and Cliffie Stone, it was Travis' first release to make it to number one on the Folk Juke Box charts where it stayed for fourteen weeks and a total of twenty-three weeks on the chart.  The B-side of "Divorce Me C.O.D.," a song entitled "Missouri," peaked at number five  on the same chart.

Cover versions
Later in 1946, The King Sisters made the top ten on the Juke Box Folk chart with their version of the song.
In 1947, Johnny Bond, also made the top ten on the Juke Box Folk chart with his version of the song.

References

 
 

Songs about divorce
1946 songs
1946 singles
Merle Travis songs
Johnny Bond songs
Songs written by Merle Travis
Songs written by Cliffie Stone